2/6 may refer to:
2nd Battalion, 6th Marines
February 6 (month-day date notation)
2 June (day-month date notation)
Half crown (British coin)